Brahim Souleymane (born 30 December 1986) is a Mauritanian football player who plays as a goalkeeper for ACS Ksar and the Mauritanian national team.

References

1986 births
Living people
Association football goalkeepers
Mauritania international footballers
Mauritanian footballers
2019 Africa Cup of Nations players
Mauritania A' international footballers
2018 African Nations Championship players